Paul Evdoros Alexander Joannides (born 4 November 1945, London) is an emeritus professor of the History of Art in the University of Cambridge and fellow of Clare Hall.

Career 
Joannides is employed by the Department of History of Art at the University of Cambridge. He was appointed as assistant lecturer in 1973, lecturer in 1978, reader in 2002 and finally om professor in 2004. In 1981 he became a fellow at Clare Hall, Cambridge. He was chargé de mission of the Musée du Louvre from 1991 to 1992. He is a member of the Société de l'Histoire de l'Art Français.

Work
Joannides completed his PhD on the French Romantic painter Eugène Delacroix under Professor Lee Johnson. He is best known for his numerous academic articles on Italian renaissance artists and on the French romantic painters in specialist art magazines like The Burlington Magazine and Apollo.

Books published by him
 The Drawings of Raphael, Phaidon Press 1983.
 Masaccio and Masolino, Phaidon Press, 1993.
 Titian to 1518: The Assumption of Genius, Yale University Press, 2001.

Books co-edited by him
 Reactions to the Master: Responses to Michelangelo in the sixteenthcentury, co-edited with Francis Ames-Lewis, Ashgate Press, 2003.

Exhibition catalogues
 Michelangelo and his Influence, exhibition of 68 drawings for the Royal Collection, circulated in three venues in the United States and two in the UK, October 1996-April 1998, The National Gallery of Art, Washington and Lund Humphries, London, 1996.
 Raphael and His Age - Drawings from the Palais des Beaux-Arts, Lille, exhibition of 57 drawings shown at the Cleveland Museum of Art, and the Palais des Beaux-Arts, Lille, 2002-2003. Published in English and in French by the Cleveland Museum of Art and the Réunion des Musées.
 Late Raphael, (co-curated with Tom Henry), exhibition at the Prado and Musée du Louvre 2012-2013.

Collection Catalogues
 Michel-Ange, Ecole, Copistes, Inventaire des Dessins Italiens, Musée du Louvre, Réunion des Musées Nationaux, 2003.
 The Drawings by Michelangelo and his followers in the Ashmolean Museum, Oxford, CUP, 2007.

Personal life

His second wife was art historian Marianne Ysobel Joannides, née Sachs, who died of cancer aged 61 at home in Saffron Walden on 23 March 2007. She had taught history of art at the University of Kent at Canterbury, and was latterly employed at Bonhams auctioneers in London as a consultant in old master drawings. Whilst working at Phillips Auctioneers in 1994 she arranged a loan exhibition in London of Master Drawings from the De Pass Collection, Royal Cornwall Museum, Truro (Catalogue ).

References

Living people
Academics of the University of Cambridge
British art historians
1945 births
Fellows of Clare Hall, Cambridge